Oriental giant squirrels are cat-sized tree squirrels from the genus Ratufa in the subfamily Ratufinae. They are a distinctive element of the fauna of south and southeast Asia.

Species
There are four living species of oriental giant squirrels:

In prehistoric times this lineage was more widespread. For example, animals very similar to Ratufa and possibly belonging to this genus, at least belonging to the Ratufinae, were part of the early Langhian (Middle Miocene, some 16–15.2 million years ago) Hambach fauna of Germany.

References

Mammals of Asia

Langhian first appearances
Extant Miocene first appearances
Taxa named by John Edward Gray